Sahitya Akademi Translation Prizes are given each year to writers for their outstanding translations work in the 24 languages, since 1989.

Recipients  
Following is the list of recipients of Sahitya Akademi translation prizes for their works written in English. The award, as of 2019, consisted of 50,000.

See also 

 List of Sahitya Akademi Award winners for English

External links
 Akademi Translation Prizes For English Language

References

English
Indian literary awards
Awards established in 1989
Translation awards